Jizbice is a municipality and village in Nymburk District in the Central Bohemian Region of the Czech Republic. It has about 400 inhabitants.

Administrative parts
The village of Zavadilka is an administrative part of Jizbice.

References

Villages in Nymburk District